Freebandz is an American record label founded by American rapper Future. The label's releases are distributed through Epic Records.

History

2011–2012: We Global
Freebandz was founded by Future.  Future signed a major label deal with Epic Records in September 2011, days before the release of his mixtape, Streetz Calling. The mixtape was described by XXL magazine as ranging from "simple and soundly executed boasts" to "futuristic drinking and drugging jams" to "tales of the grind." A Pitchfork review remarked that on the mixtape Future comes "as close as anyone to perfecting this thread of ringtone pop, where singing and rapping are practically the same thing, and conversing 100% through Auto-Tune doesn't mean you still can't talk about how you used to sell drugs. It would almost feel antiquated if Future weren't amassing hits, or if he weren't bringing some subtle new dimensions to the micro-genre."

Though Future had told MTV that Streetz Calling would be his final mixtape prior to the release of his debut studio album, another mixtape, Astronaut Status, was released in January 2012. In December 2011, Future was featured on the cover of Issue #77 of The FADER. Before his album being released in April 2012. XXL'''s Troy Mathews wrote, "While Astronaut Status is up and down and never really hits the highs like 'Racks', 'Tony Montana', and 'Magic' that fans have come to expect from Future, it’s apparent that he’s poised to continue the buzz of 2011 humming right along into 2012." Future was selected to the annual XXL Freshmen list in early 2012.

His debut album Pluto, originally planned for January, was eventually released on April 17.  It included remixes of "Tony Montana" featuring Drake and "Magic" featuring T.I. According to Future, "'Magic' was the first record T.I. jumped on when he came outta jail. Like, he was out of jail a day and he jumped straight on the 'Magic' record without me even knowing about it." The track became Future's first single to enter the Billboard Hot 100 chart. Other collaborators on the album include Trae Tha Truth, R. Kelly and Snoop Dogg   On October 8, 2012, Pusha T released "Pain" featuring Future, the first single from his upcoming debut album.

It was announced that Future will be repackaging his debut album Pluto on November 27, 2012 under the name Pluto 3D featuring 3 new songs and 2 remix songs including the remix for "Same Damn Time" featuring Diddy and Ludacris, as well as his newest street single "Neva End (Remix)" featuring Kelly Rowland. In 2012, Future wrote, produced and was featured on "Loveeeeeee Song" taken from Barbadian singer Rihanna's seventh studio album Unapologetic.

2013–present: Various projects
On January 15, 2013, Future released the compilation mixtape F.B.G.: The Movie which features the artists signed to his Freebandz label: Young Scooter, Casino, Maceo, Mexico Rann, and Slice 9. It was certified platinum for having over 250,000 downloads on popular mixtape site DatPiff.
Future said of his second studio album Future Hendrix it will be a more substantive musical affair than his debut album and will feature R&B music along with his usual "street bangers". The album was to be released in 2013. The album would feature Kanye West, Rihanna, Ciara, Drake,  Kelly Rowland, Jeremih, Diplo,  and André 3000, among others.

The album's lead single, "Karate Chop" featuring Casino, premiered on January 25, 2013 and was sent to urban radio on January 29, 2013. The song is produced by Metro Boomin.  The official remix, which features Lil Wayne, was sent radio and was released on iTunes on February 19, 2013. On August 7, 2013, Future changed the title of his second album from Future Hendrix to Honest and announced that it would be released on November 26, 2013. It was later revealed that the album would be pushed back to April 22, 2014, as it was said that Future has tour dates with Drake on Would You Like A Tour?. In December 2013, it was announced that Future would make a guest appearance on Kat Dahlia's upcoming debut, My Garden. Future released DS2 on July 16, 2015.

On September 20, 2015, Future released a joint-mixtape with Canadian rapper Drake, What a Time to Be Alive.

On January 17, 2016, Future released another mixtape, titled Purple Reign, with productions from Metro Boomin, Southside, Zaytoven, and more.

On February 5, 2016, Future premiered his fourth studio album on DJ Khaled's debut of his We The Best Radio show on Beats 1.

Musical style
Future uses Auto-Tune in his songs. Rapper T-Pain, who also uses that audio processor, criticized Future, stating that the rapper doesn't know how to use it correctly. After that announcement Future stated in an interview; "When I first used Auto-Tune, I never used it to sing. I wasn't using it the way T-Pain was. I used it to rap because it makes my voice sound grittier. Now everybody wants to rap in Auto-Tune. Future's not everybody."

Notable artists
Future
Young Scooter 
Doe Boy
DJ Esco
 Tru Life
 Lil Double 0
Real Boston Richey
Guap Tarantino
FBG Casino
Richie Souf
Moneymaking Kobi

Discography
Studio albums

 Pluto (2012)
 Honest (2014)
 DS2 (2015)
 EVOL (2016)
 FUTURE (2017)
 HNDRXX (2017)
 The Wizrd (2019)
 High Off Life (2020)
 I Never Liked You (2022)

Singles
 Bad Tings'' feat. DB Bantino - Zoey Dollaz

Awards and nominations

BET Awards
The BET Awards were established in 2001 by the Black Entertainment Television network to celebrate African Americans and other individuals in music, acting, sports, and other fields of entertainment over the past year.

BET Hip Hop Awards
The BET Hip Hop Awards are an annual awards show, airing on BET, showcasing hip hop performers, producers and music video directors.

Much Music Video Awards
The Much Music Video Awards are annual awards presented by the Canadian TV channel Much to honour the year's best music videos.

References

American record labels
Record labels established in 2011
American hip hop record labels
Vanity record labels